Alfred G. "Herbie" Pennell (1921-2000) was an American polo player and long-time manager of the Palm Beach Polo and Country Club in Palm Beach, Florida.

As a polo player
In the 1950s and 1960s, Pennell was a renowned polo player, handicapped at 6 outdoors and 8 indoors. He won the Indoor Twelve Goal in 1955, the Delegates and Monty Waterbury Cups in 1956, the U.S. Arena Chairman's Cup (formerly Arena 12-goal and Jr. Championship) six times (1950, '55, '57, '63, '64, '65), three Senior Championships (formerly Class A) in 1952, 1956, 1957, the 1952 Inter-circuit Cup (formerly 12-goal), and the 1948 Chairman's Cup (formerly 12-goal).

As a polo club manager
In the 1970s and 1980s, he was the club manager of the Meadowbrook Polo Club, the Blind Brook Polo Club, the Squadron A Armory Polo Club and the Palm Beach Polo and Country Club.

Legacy
The Herbie Pennell Cup is named for him. In 2012, he received the Philip Iglehart Award from the Museum of Polo and Hall of Fame in Lake Worth, Florida.

References

1921 births
2000 deaths
People from Palm Beach, Florida
American polo players